Richard Henry Jones (born August 26, 1950) is an American diplomat and the former Deputy Executive Director of the International Energy Agency.

Jones is a career Foreign Service Officer and member of the Senior Foreign Service. He has served as United States Ambassador to Israel (2005–2008), Senior Advisor to the Secretary of State and Coordinator for Iraq Policy (February–September 2005), Chief Policy Officer and Deputy Administrator for the Coalition Provisional Authority in Baghdad (November 2003 - June 2004), Ambassador to Kuwait (2001–2004), Ambassador to Kazakhstan (1998–2000), and Ambassador to Lebanon (1996–1998).

Early life and education
Jones was born at Barksdale Air Force Base in Bossier Parish, Louisiana. He received his Bachelor of Science degree with distinction in mathematics from Harvey Mudd College in Claremont, California and earned a master's and doctorate in business/statistics from the University of Wisconsin, Madison.

Career
Jones has been twice posted to the embassy in Riyadh and has also served in Paris and Tunis and was director of the Division of Developed Country Trade in the Bureau of Economic and Business Affairs (1987–1989) of the State Department, and later director of the State Department’s Office of Egyptian Affairs within its Bureau of Near Eastern Affairs.

Jones served as ambassador to Lebanon from February 1996 until July 1998 and ambassador to Kazakhstan from December 1998 until July 2001. He served as ambassador to Kuwait from September 2001 until July 2004. From November 2003 until June 2004, Jones served concurrently as Chief Policy Officer and Deputy Administrator for the Coalition Provisional Authority in Baghdad. He worked in Kuwait to enlisting Kuwaiti support for the Iraq War and worked under L. Paul Bremer to implement the November 15, 2003 Agreement with the Iraqi Governing Council. Jones was a senior fellow at the Belfer Center for Science and International Affairs at Harvard University's John F. Kennedy School of Government from September 2004 until January 2005.

In February 2005 Jones was named Senior Advisor to the Secretary of State and Coordinator for Iraq Policy (S/I) the highest-ranking State Department post focused entirely on Iraq policy. Jones chaired an Under Secretary of State-level interagency steering group charged with reviewing and developing Iraq policy and led U.S. diplomatic efforts on Iraq with the international community, including preparations for the June 22, 2005 Iraq International Conference in Brussels.

Jones was sworn in as ambassador to Israel by Deputy Secretary of State Robert Zoellick on September 6, 2005. He left that position on August 1, 2008.

Jones served as the deputy executive director of the International Energy Agency, based in Paris from 1 October 2008 until end of September 2013.

Jones most recently served as Chargé d'affaires ad interim at the U.S. Embassy in Beirut, Lebanon from November 2015 until June 2016.

Personal life
He is fluent in Arabic, French, German, and Russian. He served two terms on the board of the Saudi Arabian International School in Riyadh. He enjoys hiking and bicycling, as well as winter and racquet sports.

Jones married Joan Wiener in 1973 and has four children: Josh (1977), Vera (1980), Ben (1991), and Hope (1992).

External links

Entry at the United States Department of State directory
CV of Richard H. Jones (IEA website)

|-

|-

|-

|-

1950 births
Ambassadors of the United States to Israel
Ambassadors of the United States to Kazakhstan
Ambassadors of the United States to Kuwait
Ambassadors of the United States to Lebanon
Harvey Mudd College alumni
International Energy Agency officials
Harvard Kennedy School people
Living people
People from Bossier Parish, Louisiana
University of Wisconsin–Madison alumni
United States Foreign Service personnel